Guabiruba is a municipality situated in the state of Santa Catarina, Brazil, with an estimated 24,382 inhabitants. It is  located in 27°05′09″ S and 48°58′52″ W and 60 m above sea level. It was colonized principally by people from Baden, Germany.

Guabiruba is known as "Pelznickelland".

References

Municipalities in Santa Catarina (state)